
Gmina Nowinka, is a rural gmina (administrative district) in Augustów County, Podlaskie Voivodeship, in north-eastern Poland.

Villages
Gmina Nowinka contains the villages and settlements of Ateny, Barszczowa Góra, Blizna, Bryzgiel, Busznica, Cisówek, Danowskie, Józefowo, Juryzdyka, Kopanica, Krusznik, Monkinie, Nowe Gatne, Nowinka, Olszanka, Osińska Buda, Pijawne Polskie, Pijawne Wielkie, Podkrólówek, Podnowinka, Powały, Sokolne, Stare Gatne, Strękowizna, Szczeberka, Szczebra, Szczepki, Tobołowo, Walne and Zakąty.

Neighbouring gminas
Gmina Nowinka is bordered by the town of Augustów and by the gminas of Augustów, Giby, Krasnopol, Płaska, Raczki and Suwałki.

References

Nowinka
Augustów County